Kando is a department or commune of Kouritenga Province in eastern Burkina Faso. Its capital lies at the town of Kando. According to the 1996 census the department has a total population of 28,481.

Towns and villages

 Kando ( inhabitants) (capital)
 Bagwokin (586 inhabitants) 
 Bissiga (325 inhabitants) 
 Bougrétenga (2 014 inhabitants) 
 Guirgo (1 869 inhabitants) 
 Hamidin (586 inhabitants) 
 Ibga (1 368 inhabitants) 
 Kampelsezougou (1 702 inhabitants) 
 Kiongo (245 inhabitants) 
 Kodé-Mendé (3 127 inhabitants) 
 Lelkom (1 110 inhabitants) 
 Mobèga (1 054 inhabitants) 
 Nabnongomzougo (903 inhabitants) 
 Neem (590 inhabitants) 
 Nigui (1 380 inhabitants) 
 Pissi (2 420 inhabitants) 
 Poessin (472 inhabitants) 
 Salagin (634 inhabitants) 
 Soalga (4 551 inhabitants) 
 Tankoemsé (596 inhabitants) 
 Tansèga (410 inhabitants)
 Yargo (210 inhabitants)

References

Departments of Burkina Faso
Kouritenga Province